Errington Edison Kelly (born 8 April 1958) is a former footballer who played in the Football League for Bristol Rovers, Bristol City, Lincoln City, and Peterborough United in England. He had more than 100 appearances during his five seasons at Peterborough United, and later played in Sweden for Grebbestads IF and Gimonäs CK.

Early life and career 
Kelly was born on the island of Saint Vincent, and moved to Coventry as a young boy. His younger brother Tony also became a football player.

Early in his career, he joined AP Leamington and played for VS Rugby for one season. He briefly joined Ledbury Town in the summer of 1981, but transferred a month later to Bristol Rovers for £1,000.

Career 
In September 1981, Kelly was signed by manager Terry Cooper at Bristol Rovers, shortly before Bobby Gould took over as manager. His first League appearance was in February 1982, during the Rovers' 3–2 win against Exeter City.

He briefly moved to Lincoln City in January 1983, and joined Terry Cooper and his brother Tony Kelly at Bristol City two months later.

In July 1983, he linked up with Gould again at First Division Coventry City. Initially joining Coventry with a three-month contract, the deal was extended for two months after Kelly scored four goals in six games for the reserve team. Although Kelly appeared in a couple of pre-season friendlies, he did not break through to the first team.

Kelly moved to Peterborough United on loan in March 1984. After netting seven goals in 11 appearances, Kelly was made permanent. Over five seasons with Peterborough, Kelly made more than 100 appearances. He was once considered "Peterborough's only skilful player", the team's "leading marksman in 1984–1985", and "on his day, the division's most dangerous striker". 

Although he was popular with Peterborough fans, over time he developed a public love-hate relationship with manager John Wile, and was disciplined on multiple occasions. By 1986, the Peterborough Standard referred to Kelly as "the exciting but controversial striker", and lamented that he was "unfortunately, very inconsistent". In May 1986, Kelly was released on a free transfer, along with five other players. 

During the 1986 Swedish football season, Kelly played for Grebbestads IF in the Third Division, and won the team award for top goalscorer, with six goals. By January 1987, he had returned to England to play for Peterborough United, signing a one-year contract in June of that year, but struggled with injuries. 

Kelly left for Sweden once again in April 1988 to play for Grebbestads IF, and moved to Gimonas the following season. He later returned to England and became a football coach and English teacher.

References

External links
 Errington Kelly stats at Neil Brown stat site
 Errington Kelly stats at Grebbestads IF
 Errington Kelly interview with 6TownsRadio on YouTube

Living people
1958 births
Saint Vincent and the Grenadines footballers
English footballers
Association football wingers
Association football forwards
English Football League players
Ledbury Town F.C. players
Bristol Rovers F.C. players
Lincoln City F.C. players
Bristol City F.C. players
Coventry City F.C. players
Peterborough United F.C. players
Black British sportspeople